Aki-Matilda Tilia Ditte Høegh-Dam (born 17 October 1996 in Hillerød) is a Danish-Greenlandic politician, who is a member of the Folketing for the Siumut political party. She was elected into parliament at the 2019 Danish general election, entering parliament at 22 years old, becoming its youngest member.

Political career
In the Danish general election on 5 June 2019, Høegh-Dam was one of two Greenlanders who succeeded in become members of the Folketing. Expressing strong support for Mette Frederiksen, head of the Social Democrats, she campaigned on the basis that Denmark should take more care of its responsibilities for Greenlanders. She also supports independence for Greenland.

Personal life
Born on 17 October 1996 in Hillerød, Aki-Matilda Tilia Ditte Høegh-Dam is the daughter of Kim Høegh-Dam, a fisherman and seaman, and Bitten Høegh-Dam, a schoolteacher. The youngest child in the family, she has two brothers and two half-sisters on her father's side. She is half Danish and half Greenlandic with two Danish and two ethnically Greenlandic grandparents. She was brought up in Sisimiut on Greenland's west coast. When she was 15, as a volunteer in Nakuusa (UNICEF's project in support of Greenlandic children), she went on a trip around Greenland's coast during which she discussed politics with a friend. As a result, she decided to join Siumut, a social democratic political party. After joining the party's youth organization, her interest in politics continued to grow.

After graduating from high school, in 2014 she began studying political science at the University of Copenhagen and graduated in 2019. In 2015, she participated in the Miss Denmark competition. Although she finished in sixth place, the event did much to draw attention to her in Greenland.

External links 
 Biography on the website of the Danish Parliament (Folketinget)

References

1996 births
Living people
People from Hillerød Municipality
Siumut politicians
Greenlandic women in politics
Women members of the Folketing
21st-century Greenlandic politicians
21st-century Danish women politicians
Greenlandic members of the Folketing
Members of the Folketing 2019–2022
Members of the Folketing 2022–2026